Upper Mingo is an unincorporated community in southern Randolph County, West Virginia, United States.

References

Unincorporated communities in Randolph County, West Virginia
Unincorporated communities in West Virginia